Sunil Chandrakant Gudge (31 December 1959 – 3 May 2016) was an Indian first-class cricketer who played for Maharashtra cricket team from 1979/80 to 1996/97.

References

External links
 
 

1959 births
2016 deaths
Indian cricketers
Maharashtra cricketers
Cricketers from Pune
West Zone cricketers